Eucarlia is a genus of spirobolidan millipedes containing six species; most of which are endemic to the island nation of Seychelles, and one native to the Indonesian island of Sulawesi. Four of the Seychelles species have been assessed by the IUCN Red List as either endangered, critically endangered, or extinct.

Description
The body colors include solid gray, brown, and orange and some possess a mid-dorsal stripe.

Species

References

Spirobolida
Millipedes of Africa
Millipedes of Asia
Arthropods of Seychelles